Omiécourt is a former commune in the Somme department in Hauts-de-France in northern France. On 1 January 2017, it was merged into the new commune Hypercourt.

Geography

Population

See also
Communes of the Somme department
Georges Vérez, sculptor of war memorial.

References

External links

Former communes of Somme (department)
Populated places disestablished in 2017